Robert François Laugier (1722–1793) was a French pharmacologist. He is known for his book "Institutiones pharmaceuticae sive philosophia pharmaceutica" and for his work on the alembic.

References

1722 births
1793 deaths
18th-century French chemists
French pharmacologists
Scientists from Nancy, France